This is a list of board wargames by historical genre (and some subgenres) showing their publication history. All games can be presumed to have been published in English unless another language is noted.

Historical 
The Art of Siege (Simulations Publications, Inc., 1979)
Combined Arms (Simulations Publications, Inc. – S&T #46, 1974)

Ancient

Early Middle Ages 
Belisarius: The Byzantine Empire Strikes (Decision Games – S&T #210, 2002)
Byzantium (Warfrog, 2005)
Dark Ages: Tactical Warfare, 500-1300 (Simulations Publications, Inc., 1971)
Norseman: Viking Kingdoms of the North Sea (Simulations Canada, 1985)
Viking (Simulations Publications, Inc., 1975)
Viking Raiders (Standard Games, 1987; Eurogames)
Vikingatid (Trollspel, 1998 )

Middle Ages 
Agincourt (Simulations Publications, Inc., 1978)
The Black Prince: The Battle of Navarette, 1367 (Simulations Publications, Inc., 1979)
Conquistador (SPI – S&T #58, 1976, Avalon Hill, 1983)
Cry Havoc (Standard Games, 1981)
The Crusades (SPI – S&T #70, 1978)
Empires of the Middle Ages (Simulations Publications, Inc., 1980, Decision Games, 2004?)
Granada: The Fall of Moslem Spain (Avalanche Press, 2003)
The Golden Horde (Excalibre Games, 1978)
Hammer of the Scots (Columbia Games, 2003)
The Legend of Robin Hood (Operational Studies Group, 1979; Avalon Hill, 1980)
Scotland the Brave (Avalanche Press, 1998)
Renaissance of Infantry (SPI – S&T #22, 1970)
Yeoman (Simulations Publications, Inc., 1975)

Early modern 
1776 (Avalon Hill, 1974)
The Alamo (Simulations Publications, Inc., 1981; Decision Games, ?)
Alma (Simulations Publications, Inc., 1978)
The American Revolution 1775–1783 (Simulations Publications, Inc., 1972)
Arcola (Operational Studies Group, 1979) – Battle for Italy (Avalon Hill, 1981)
Armada: The War With Spain 1585–1604 (SPI – S&T #72, 1979)
Balaclava (SPI, 1978)
Battle of Guilford Courthouse (Game Designers' Workshop, 1978)
The Battle of Lobositz (Game Designers' Workshop, 1978)
The Battle of Saratoga (Oldenburg Grenadiers, 1976)
The Battle of the Alma (Game Designers' Workshop, 1978; Kokusai-Tsushin – Command #38, 2001 )
Breitenfeld (SPI – S&T #55, 1976)
The Campaigns of Frederick the Great (3W, 1993)
La Carga de la Brigada Ligera (NAC, 1987 )
Close Action (Clash of Arms, 1997)
Crimean War Battles (Simulations Publications, Inc., 1978; Decision Games – S&T #201, 2000)
The English Civil War (Ariel Productions Ltd, Ironside Games, Philmar; 1978)
Fighting Sail: Sea Combat in the Age of Canvas and Shot 1775–1815 (SPI – S&T #85, 1981)
Frederick the Great (SPI – S&T #49, 1975; Avalon Hill, 1982)
Friedrich (Histogame, 2004 ; Simmons Games, 2005)
Frigate: Sea War in the Age of Sail (Simulations Publications, Inc., 1974)
Geronimo (Avalon Hill, 1995)
Gunslinger (Avalon Hill, 1982)
Kingmaker (PhilMar Ltd., 1974; Avalon Hill, 1976)
Kolin 1757: Frederick's First Defeat (Clash of Arms, 1994)
Leuthen: Frederick's Greatest Victory (Clash of Arms, 1997)
Machiavelli (Battleline Publications, 1977; Avalon Hill, 1983)
A Mighty Fortress (Simulations Publications, Inc., 1977)
Musket & Pike (Simulations Publications, Inc., 1973)
Quebec 1759 (Gamma Two Games, 1972; Avalon Hill, 1977?; Columbia Games, ?)
Samurai (Battleline Publications, 1979; Avalon Hill, 1980)
Saratoga (GMT Games, 1998)
Saratoga: 1777 (Rand Game Associates, 1974; Gamut of Games, ?)
Shogun (Milton Bradley, 1986) – Samurai Swords (Milton Bradley, 1995)
Shogun (Queen Games, 2006)
The Siege of Constantinople (SPI – S&T #66, 1978)
Soldier Kings (Avalanche Press, 2002)
Soldier Raj (Avalanche Press, 2004)
Thirty Years War: Europe in Agony, 1618–1648 (GMT Games, 2001)
Wallenstein (Queen Games, 2002)
War of 1812 (Gamma Two Games, 1973; Avalon Hill, 1977?; Columbia Games, ?)
Washington's War (GMT Games, 2010)
Wooden Ships and Iron Men (Battleline Publications, 1974; Avalon Hill, 1975)
We the People (Avalon Hill, 1994)

Napoleonic era 
Game of War (Guy Debord), 1965
1809: Napoleon's Danube Campaign (Victory Games, 1984)
1812: The Campaign of Napoleon in Russia (Simulations Publications, Inc., 1972)
1815: The Waterloo Campaign (Game Designers' Workshop, 1982)
Austerlitz: Battle of the Three Emperors (Simulations Publications, Inc., 1973)
La Bataille d'Albuera-Espagnol (Clash of Arms, 1984)
La Bataille d'Auerstaedt (Marshal Enterprises, 1978; Clash of Arms, 1991; AGEMA, 1977 )
La Bataille d'Austerlitz (Marshal Enterprises, 1980)
La Bataille d'Espagnol-Talavera (Marshal Enterprises, 1979; Clash of Arms, 1995)
La Bataille d'Orthez (Clash of Arms, 2000)
La Bataille de Corunna-Espagnol (Clash of Arms, 1995)
La Bataille de Deutsch Wagram (Marshal Enterprises, 1981)
La Bataille de la Moscowa (Martial Enterprises, 1975; Game Designers' Workshop, 1977, Clash of Arms, 2011)
La Bataille de Ligny (Clash of Arms, 1991)
La Bataille de Lützen (Clash of Arms, 1999)
La Bataille de Mont Saint Jean (Clash of Arms, 1993)
La Bataille de Preusisch Eylau (Marshal Enterprises, 1978; Clash of Arms, 1990)
La Bataille des Quatre bras (Clash of Arms, 1991)
La Bataille de Dresde (Clash of Arms, 2015)
Battles of the Hundred Days (Operational Studies Group, 1979) – Hundred Days Battles (Avalon Hill, 1983)
Bonaparte at Marengo (Simmons Games, 2005)
Borodino: Napoleon in Russia (Simulations Publications, Inc. – S&T #32, 1972)
Dresden (Simulations Publications, Inc. – S&T #75, 1979)
Empires in Arms (Australian Design Group, 1983; Avalon Hill, 1985)
Eylau: Napoleon's Winter Battle, 1807 (Game Designers' Workshop, 1980)
La Patrie en Danger (Operational Studies Group, 2014)
Napoleon (Gamma Two Games, 1974; Avalon Hill, 1977; Columbia Games ?)
Napoleon Against Russia (Operational Studies Group, 2015)
Napoleon at Bay (Avalon Hill, 1983)
Napoleon at Leipzig (Operational Studies Group, 1979; Clash of Arms, 1988, 2013)
Napoleon at War: Four Battles (Simulations Publications, Inc., 1975)
Napoleon at Waterloo (Simulations Publications, Inc., 1971)
Napoleon in Europe (Eagle Games, 2001)
Napoleon in the Desert (Avalanche Press, 2002)
Napoleon on the Danube (Avalanche Press, 2005)
Napoleon Retreats (Operational Studies Group, 2019)
Napoleon's Art of War (Simulations Publications, Inc. – S&T #75, 1979)
Napoleon's Last Battles (Simulations Publications, Inc., 1976; TSR, Inc., 1984)
Napoleon's Last Gamble (Operational Studies Group, 2016)
Napoleon's Quagmire (Operational Studies Group, 2017)
Napoleon's Resurgence (Operational Studies Group, 2018)
Ney vs. Wellington (Simulations Publications, Inc. – S&T #74, 1979)
Preussisch-Eylau (Avalanche Press, 1999)
Soldier Emperor (Avalanche Press, 2003)
The Struggle of Nations (Avalon Hill, 1982)
The Coming Storm (Operational Studies Group, 2010)
The Last Success (Operational Studies Group, 2012)
Toulon, 1793 (Legion Wargames, 2014)
War and Peace (Avalon Hill, 1980)
Waterloo (Avalon Hill, 1962)
Wellington (GMT Games, 2005)
Wellington's Victory: Battle of Waterloo (Simulations Publications, Inc., 1976; TSR, Inc., 1983)

American Civil War

Skirmish 

Devil's Den (Operational Studies Group, 1980, Avalon Hill, 1985)

Tactical 
Antietam: The Bloodiest Day (Simulations Publications, Inc., 1975)
Battle Cry (Avalon Hill, 2000)
The Battles of Bull Run (Simulations Publications, Inc., 1973)
Blue and Gray (Simulations Publications, Inc., 1975; TSR, Inc., 1983; Overlord Games, ?; Decision Games, 1995)
Blue and Gray II (Simulations Publications, Inc., 1976)
Cedar Mountain: The Prelude to Bull Run (Simulations Publications, Inc. – S&T #86, 1981)
Cemetery Hill (Simulations Publications, Inc., 1975)
Chancellorsville (Avalon Hill, 1961)
Chickamauga & Chattanooga (Avalanche Press, 2003)
Fury in the West (Battleline Publications, 1977; Avalon Hill, 1979)
Gettysburg (Avalon Hill, 1958)
Gettysburg 1863 (Avalanche Press, 2002)
Lee vs. Meade: The Battle of Gettysburg (Rand Game Associates, 1974; Gamut of Games, ?)
Seven Days Battles (Battleline Publications, 1973)
Stonewall: The Battle of Kernstown (Simulations Publications, Inc. – S&T #67, 1978)
Thunder on South Mountain (Blue Guidon, 2000)

Grand Tactical 
Bloody April: The Battle of Shiloh, 1862 (Simulations Publications, Inc., 1979)
Terrible Swift Sword (Simulations Publications, Inc., 1976; TSR, Inc., 1986)

Operational 
Atlanta (Guidon Games, 1973)
Drive on Washington (Simulations Publications, Inc., 1980)
Lee vs. Grant (Victory Games, 1988) – Wilderness Campaign, an ancestor of the Avalon Hill "Stonewall Jackson's Way" series
Mosby's Raiders (Victory Games, 1985)
Objective: Atlanta (Battleline Publications, 1977)
Shenandoah (Battleline Publications, 1975)
Stonewall Jackson's Way (Avalon Hill, 1992) – Cedar Mountain to Second Bull Run
Here Come the Rebels (Avalon Hill, 1993; Multi-Man Publishing, ?) – Antietam Campaign
Roads to Gettysburg (Avalon Hill, 1993; Multi-Man Publishing, ?) – Gettysburg Campaign
Stonewall in the Valley (Avalon Hill, 1995) – Shenandoah Campaign
Stonewall's Last Battle (Avalon Hill, 1996) – Chancellorsville Campaign
On To Richmond (Avalon Hill, 1997; Multi-Man Publishing, ?) – McClellan's Peninsula Campaign
Grant Takes Command (Avalon Hill, 2001) – Wilderness Campaign
Battle Above the Clouds (Multi-Man Publishing, 2011) – Chickamauga/Chattanooga

Strategic

Grand Strategy 
The American Civil War 1861–1865 (Simulations Publications, Inc. – S&T #43, 1974)
The American Civil War 1861–1865 (TSR, Inc. – S&T #93, 1983)
Battle Cry (Milton Bradley, 1961)
Civil War (Avalon Hill, 1961)
The Civil War 1861–1865 (Victory Games, 1983)
A House Divided (Game Designers' Workshop, 1981; Phalanx Games, 2001)
For the People (Avalon Hill, 1998; GMT Games, 2000)
The U.S. Civil War (GMT Games, 2015)
War Between the States (Simulations Publications, Inc., 1978)

19th Century/Industrial warfare 
Diplomacy (self-published, 1959; Games Research, 1961; Avalon Hill, 1976).
1898: The Spanish–American War (Avalanche Press, 2000)
1904–1905: The Russo-Japanese War (Avalanche Press, 1999)
Chaco (Game Designers' Workshop, 1973)
Custer's Last Stand (Battleline Publications, 1976)
Pax Brittanica (game) (Victory Games, 1985)
Red Sun Rising (Simulations Publications, Inc., 1977)
Rifle & Saber (Simulations Publications, Inc., 1973)
Viva España (Battleline Publications, 1977)

World War I 
1914 (Avalon Hill, 1968)
1918 (Simulations Publications, Inc., 1970)
Aces High (World Wide Wargames).
Blue Max (Game Designers' Workshop, 1983) – Les Ailes de la Gloire (Oriflam, ? )
Brusilov Offensive (Simulations Publications, Inc., 1978)
Cruiser Warfare (Avalanche Press, 2004)
Fatal Alliances: The Great War (Compass Games), 2016
Fight in the Skies (Guidon Games, 1972; TSR, 1975) – Dawn Patrol (TSR, 1982)
Flying Circus (Simulations Publications, Inc., 1972)
Great War at Sea: The Mediterranean (Avalanche Press, 1996)
Great War at Sea: The North and Baltic Seas – Jutland (Avalanche Press, 1998)
The Guns of August (Avalon Hill, 1981)
Infantry Attacks: Imperial Twilight (Avalanche Press, 2006)
Jutland (Avalon Hill, 1967)
The Kaiser's Battle (Simulations Publications, Inc. – S&T #83, 1980; Decision Games, ?)
Knights of the Air (Avalon Hill, 1987)
Paths of Glory (GMT Games, 1999)
Pursuit of Glory (GMT Games, 2008)
The Marne: Home Before the Leaves Fall (Simulations Publications, Inc., 1972)
Richthofen's War (Avalon Hill, 1972)
Soldiers (Simulations Publications, Inc., 1972)
The Strand War Game (The Strand Magazine, 1915)
They Shall Not Pass: The Battle of Verdun, 1916 (Avalanche Press, 2006)
To the Green Fields Beyond (Simulations Publications, Inc., 1978)
Trenchfoot: Bullets & Bayonets in the Great War (Game Designers' Workshop, 1981)
Verdun (Conflict Games, 1972; Game Designers' Workshop, 1978)
Verdun 1916 (Histoire & Collections – Vae Victis #46, 2002 )
Wings (Yaquinto Publications, 1981; Excalibre Games, 1993)
World War I (SPI – S&T #51, 1975; Excalibre Games, ?; Decision Games, 1994)

World War II

Tactical wargames 
B-17, Queen of the Skies (Avalon Hill, 1983)
Advanced Squad Leader (Avalon Hill, 1985; Multi-Man Publishing, 2001)
Ambush! (Victory Games, 1983)
Commando (Simulations Publications, Inc., 1979)
Conflict of Heroes (Academy Games, 2008)
Memoir '44 (Days of Wonder, 2004)
Panzer 44 (SPI, 1975)
Panzer Leader (Avalon Hill, 1974)
PanzerBlitz (Avalon Hill, 1970)
Patton's Best (Avalon Hill, 1987)
Sniper (SPI, 1973)
Squad Leader (Avalon Hill, 1977)
Storm Over Arnhem (Avalon Hill, 1982)
Tank Battle (Milton Bradley, 1975)
 Tide of Iron (Fantasy Flight Games, 2007; Re-print 1A Games, 2014)
Tobruk (Avalon Hill, 1975)
Dreadnought: Surface Combat In The Battleship Era, 1906–45 (Simulations Publications, Inc., 1975)

Operational

European Theatre

Eastern Front 
EastFront (Columbia Games, 1991)
Evropa (Game Designers' Workshop, 1973) – Fire in the East (Game Designers' Workshop, 1984)
Turning Point: Stalingrad (Avalon Hill, 1989)
Von Manstein: Battles for the Ukraine 1941–1944 (Rand Games, 1975)
War in the East (Simulations Publications, Inc., 1974)
Winter War (Ad Technos, 1986 )
Winter War: The Russo-Finnish Conflict November 1939-March 1940 (Simulations Publications, Inc. – S&T #33, 1972)
A Winter War (Game Research/Design, 1994)

Western Front 
Alsace 1945 (Avalanche Press, 2005)
America Triumphant: Battle of the Bulge (Avalanche Press, 2003)
Anzio (Avalon Hill, 1969)
Anzio Beachhead (SPI – S&T #20, 1969; 3W – S&T #134, 1990)
The Ardennes Offensive (Simulations Publications, Inc., 1973)
Arnhem (Panzerfaust Publications – Panzerfaust #?, 1972)
Arnhem (Simulations Publications, Inc., 1976)
Arnhem 1944 (Histoire & Collections – Vae Victis #13, 1997 )
Arnhem and Operation Market-Garden (Spartan International – Spartan International Vol 3. No. 5, 1971)
Arnhem Bridge (Attactix Adventure Games, 1982)
Atlantic Wall (Simulations Publications, Inc., 1978)
Avalanche: The Invasion of Italy (Avalanche Press, 1994)
Avalanche: The Salerno Landings (Game Designers' Workshop, 1976)
Axis & Allies: D-Day (Avalon Hill, 2004)
Bastogne (SPI – S&T #20, 1969)
Bastogne or Bust (Terran Games, 1995)
Bastogne: The Desperate Defense, December 1944 (Simulations Publications, Inc., 1976; Fresno Gaming Association, 1992)
Bastogne: Crossroads of Death (Pacific Rim Publishing, 1991)
Battle for the Ardennes (Simulations Publications, Inc., 1978)
Battle of the Bulge (Avalon Hill, 1965)
The Big Red One (Simulations Publications, Inc., 1980)
Bitter Woods: The Battle of the Bulge (Avalon Hill, 1998; Multi-Man Publishing, ?, L2 Design Group, 2003)
Breakout & Pursuit (Simulations Publications, Inc., 1972)
Breakout: Normandy (Avalon Hill, 1993)
'Bulge': The Battle for the Ardennes (Simulations Publications, Inc., 1980)
Cobra (SPI – S&T #65, 1977; TSR, Inc., 1984)
D-Day: The Great Crusade (Moments in History, 2004)
Dark December (Operational Studies Group, 1979)
France 1944 (Victory Games, 1986)
Foxhole, (Diffraction Entertainment, Ltd., 2010)
Hell's Highway (Victory Games, 1983)
Highway to the Reich (Simulations Publications, Inc., 1977)
The Italian Campaign: Salerno (Decision Games – S&T #150, 1992)
Liberty Roads (Hexasim, 2009)
The Longest Day (Avalon Hill, 1980)
Major Battles and Campaigns of General George S. Patton (Research Games, 1973)
Memoir '44 (Days of Wonder, 2004)
Monty's Gamble: Market Garden (Multi-Man Publishing, 2003)
Normandy: The Invasion of Europe 1944 (Simulations Publications, Inc., 1969)
Normandy Campaign: From Beachhead to Breakout (Game Designers' Workshop, 1983)
Omaha Beachhead (Victory Games, 1987)
Operation Grenade (SPI – S&T #84, 1981)
Operation Market-Garden (Third Millennia, 1973)
Operation Market-Garden: Descent into Hell (Game Designers' Workshop, 1985)
Overlord (Conflict Games, 1973; Game Designers' Workshop, ?)
Patton's Third Army (Simulations Publications, Inc. – S&T #78, 1980; Hobby Japan, ? )
Salerno (Third Millennia, 1972)
Salerno: Operation Avalanche (West End Games, 1977)
Second Front (Game Research/Design, 1994)
Wacht am Rhein (Simulations Publications, Inc., 1976)
War in the West (Simulations Publications, Inc., 1976)
WestFront (Columbia Games, 1992)

Other campaigns 
1940 (Game Designers' Workshop, 1980)
Battle for Germany (Simulations Publications, Inc. – S&T #50, 1975; Decision Games, 1994)
The Battle of Britain (Gamescience, 1968)
Bismarck (Avalanche Press, 2005)
Bitter Victory: The Invasion of Sicily, 1943 (Avalanche Press, 2006)
Case White (Game Designers' Workshop, 1977) – First to Fight (Game Research/Design, 1991)
Dunkirk: The Battle of France (Guidon Games, 1971)
Eagle Day (Histo Games, 1973)
The Fall of France (Game Designers' Workshop, 1981)
France 1940 (Simulations Publications, Inc. – S&T #27, 1971; Avalon Hill, 1972)
Invasion of Sicily (Panzerfaust Publications – Panzerfaust Magazine #57?, 1972)
London's Burning (Avalon Hill, 1995)
Marita-Merkur (Game Designers' Workshop, 1979) – Balkan Front (Game Research/Design, 1990)
Narvik (Game Designers' Workshop, 1974) – Storm Over Scandinavia (Game Research/Design, 1998)
Strange Defeat: The Fall of France, 1940 (Avalanche Press, 2006)
Their Finest Hour (Game Designers' Workshop, 1976)

Mediterranean Theatre and North African campaign 
Air Assault on Crete (Avalon Hill, 1977)
Bloody Kasserine (Game Designers' Workshop, 1992)
Bomb Alley (Avalanche Press, 2002)
The Campaign for North Africa (Simulations Publications, Inc., 1978)
Crete (Simulations Publications, Inc. – S&T #18, 1969)
Descent on Crete (Simulations Publications, Inc., 1978)
The Desert Fox (Simulations Publications, Inc. – S&T #87, 1981)
El Alamein: Battles in North Africa (Simulations Publications, Inc., 1973)
Fall of Tobruk (Conflict Games, 1975; Cool Stuff Unlimited, 2004)
Gazala: 1942 (Avalanche Press, 2002)
Island of Death: The Invasion of Malta, 1942 (Avalanche Press, 2006)
Kasserine (GMT Games, 2001)
Kasserine Pass (Conflict Games, 1973; Game Designers' Workshop, ?)
Operation Crusader (Game Designers' Workshop, 1978)
Panzer Armee Afrika (Simulations Publications, Inc., 1973; Avalon Hill, 1982)
Race for Tunis (Game Designers' Workshop, 1992)
Rommel in the Desert (Columbia Games, 1982)
Torch (Game Designers' Workshop, 1985)
Western Desert (Game Designers' Workshop, 1982) – War in the Desert (Game Research/Design, 1995)

Pacific and Asia 
1942 (Game Designers' Workshop, 1978)
Battle for Midway (Game Designers' Workshop, 1976)
Carrier (Victory Games, 1990)
Coral Sea (Game Designers' Workshop, 1974)
Eastern Fleet (Avalanche Press, 2001)
The Fast Carriers (Simulations Publications, Inc., 1976)
Flat Top (Battleline Publications, 1977; Avalon Hill, 1981)
Guadalcanal (Avalon Hill, 1966)
Guadalcanal (Avalon Hill, 1992)
Indian Ocean Adventure (Game Designers' Workshop, 1978)
Leyte Gulf (Avalanche Press, 2005)
McArthur's Return: Leyte 1944 (Avalanche Press, 1994)
Midway (Avalon Hill, 1964)
Midway (Sho-Kikaku, 1986 )
Midway (Avalon Hill, 1991)
Midway (Avalanche Press, 2002)
Operation Cannibal (Avalanche Press, 1996)
Operation Olympic (Simulations Publications, Inc. – S&T #45, 1974)
SOPAC (Avalanche Press, 1999)
Strike South (Avalanche Press, 2005)
War of Resistance, China Theater 1937–1941 (Game Research/Design, 1998)

Strategic

Europe 
Trial of Strength (Panther Games, 1985)
Advanced Third Reich (Avalon Hill, 1992)
Axis & Allies: Europe (Avalon Hill, 2000)
D-Day (Avalon Hill, 1961)
Defiant Russia: 1941 (Avalanche Press, 2004)
Europe Engulfed (GMT Games, 2002) – Winner of the Charles S. Roberts Award
Fortress Europa (Avalon Hill, 1980)
Hitler's War (Metagaming Concepts, 1981; Avalon Hill, 1984)
Luftwaffe (Avalon Hill, 1971)
Red Vengeance (Avalanche Press, 2005)
Rise and Decline of the Third Reich (Avalon Hill, 1974; Avalanche Press, 2001)
Russia Besieged (L2 Design Group, 2004)
The Russian Campaign (Jedko Games, 1975; Avalon Hill, 1976; L2 Design Group, 2003)
Russian Front (Avalon Hill, 1985)
Stalingrad (Avalon Hill, 1963)
War at Sea (Jedko Games, 1975; Avalon Hill, 1976; L2 Design Group, 2007)
War in Europe (Simulations Publications, Inc., 1976; Decision Games, 1999)
World War II: European Theater of Operations (Simulations Publications, Inc., 1973)

Mediterranean & north Africa 
Afrika Korps (Avalon Hill, 1964)

Pacific 
Axis & Allies: Pacific (Avalon Hill, 2001)
Empire of the Rising Sun (Avalon Hill, 1995)
The Great Pacific War (Avalanche Press, 2003)
Pacific War (Victory Games, 1985)
U.S.N. (Simulations Publications, Inc. – S&T #29, 1971)
Victory in the Pacific (Avalon Hill, 1977)
War in the Pacific (Simulations Publications, Inc., 1978)

Grand Strategy (Global) 
Axis & Allies (Nova Games, 1981; Milton Bradley, 1984; Avalon Hill, 2004)
Global War (Simulations Publications, Inc., 1975)
World in Flames (Australian Design Group, 1985)

Modern 
Central America: The United States' Backyard War (Victory Games, 1987)
Ici, c'est la France!: The Algerian insurgency 1954–62 (Legion Wargames, 2009)
Twilight Struggle (GMT Games, 2005)
War on Terror (TerrorBull Games, 2006)

Tactical 
Air Superiority (Game Designers' Workshop, 1987)
Air War (Simulations Publications, Inc., 1977; TSR, Inc., 1983)
Chicago, Chicago! (Simulations Publications, Inc. – S&T #21, 1970)
City-Fight (Simulations Publications, Inc., 1979)
Flight Leader (Avalon Hill, 1986)
MechWar 2 (Simulations Publications, Inc., 1979)
Patrol! (Simulations Publications, Inc., 1975)
Raid: Commando Operations in the 20th Century (Simulations Publications, Inc. – S&T #64, 1977)
Ranger (Omega Games, 1984)
The Sands of War (Game Designers' Workshop, 1991)
Sniper! (Simulations Publications, Inc., 1973; TSR, Inc., 1986)
Sniper!: Special Forces (TSR, Inc., 1988)
Tank! (Simulations Publications, Inc. – S&T #44, 1974)
Warfighter 101: Movement to Contact (BayonetGames, 2005)
Warfighter 101: The Guards (BayonetGames, 2006)
Warfighter Series: Maneuver Warrior (BayonetGames, 2006)

Arab–Israeli wars 
A Guerra do Yom Kippur, (Abril Editora, 1981 )
Across Suez (Simulations Publications, Inc., 1980; Hobby Japan, 1983 ; Decision Games, 1995)
The Arab-Israeli Wars (Avalon Hill, 1977)
Bar-Lev (Conflict Games, 1974; Game Designers' Workshop, 1977)
The Battle for Jerusalem (Simulations Publications, Inc., 1977)
Beirut '82: Arab Stalingrad (Decision Games – S&T #126, 1989)
Born to Battle: Peace for Galilee, Suez 73 (Perry Moore, 1991)
Chinese Farm (Simulations Publications, Inc., 1975; Hobby Japan, 1986 )
Crisis: Sinai 1973 (GMT Games, 1995)
Fast Attack Boats (Yaquinto Publications, 1980)
The First Arab-Israeli War (Decision Games – S&T #185, 1997; Kokusai Tsuushinsha – Command Japan #22, 1998 )
Flashpoint: Golan (Victory Games, 1991)
Golan (Simulations Publications, Inc., 1975)
Gunfight in the Valley of Tears, October 9, 1973 (Perry Moore, 2003)
IDF (Avalon Hill, 1993)
Jerusalem (Simulations Design Corporation, 1975; Mayfair Games, 1982; Cool Stuff Unlimited, 2007)
The Last Bliztkrieg 1982 (Perry Moore, 1999)
Middle East '48 (Fantasy Games Unlimited – Wargaming #4, 1979)
Middle East Battles: Suez '56 & El Arish '67 (Decision Games – S&T #226, 2005)
No Middle Ground (Microgame Design Group, 2003)
October War: Tactical Armored Combat in the Yom Kippur Conflict (Simulations Publications, Inc. – S&T #61, 1977)
Operation Badr (West End Games, 1983)
Operation Kadesh (Udo Grebe Gamedesign – Command & Strategy #3, 2005)
Operation Shock Troop (Decision Games – S&T #168, 1994)
Sinai '56 (Wargaming Enterprises, 1969)
Sinai: The Arab-Israeli Wars '56, '67 and '73 (Simulations Publications, Inc., 1973)
Suez '73 (Game Designers' Workshop, 1981)
Suez to Golan (Simulations Publications, Inc., 1979)
Valley of Tears: The 7th Brigade Stands Defiant (Armchair General, Vol.3 #2, 2006)
Yom Kippur (International Team, 1984 ; Eurogames, 1989 )
Yom Kippur (The Gamers, 1995; Oriflam, 1995 ; Kokusai Tsuushinsha – Command Japan #65, 2005 )
Yom Kippur (Ludopress – Alea #3, 2001 )
Yom Kippour 1973 (Histoire & Collections – Vae Vicitis #39, 2001 )

Korean War 
Korea: The Mobile War 1950–51 (Simulations Publications, Inc., 1970)

Vietnam War 
Citadel: The Battle of Dien Bien Phu (Game Designers' Workshop, 1977)
Dien Bien Phu (SDC – Conflict #6, 1973; Flying Buffalo, 1977?)
Diên Biên Phu (Jeux Descartes, 1980 )
Dien Bien Phu 1954 (Histoire & Collections – Vae Victis - #33, 2000 )
Grunt (Simulations Publications, Inc. – S&T  #26, 1971)
Hue (SDC – Conflict #6, 1973) – Battle for Hue (Simulations Design Corporation, 1977) – Hue (Mayfair Games, 1982)
Platoon (Avalon Hill, 1986)
Search & Destroy: Tactical Combat Vietnam 1965–1966 (Simulations Publications, Inc., 1975)
Viet Nam (Gamescience – Phillip Orbanes, Designer, 1965) 
Year of the Rat (Simulations Publications, Inc. – S&T  #35, 1972)

Contemporary World War III 
1985: Under an Iron Sky (Thin Red Line Games, 2018)
1985: Deadly Northern Lights (Thin Red Line Games, 2020)
1985: Sacred Oil (Thin Red Line Games, 2021)
2nd Fleet (Victory Games, 1986)
3rd Fleet (Victory Games, 1990)
5th Fleet (Victory Games, 1989)
6th Fleet (Victory Games, 1985)
7th Fleet (Victory Games, 1987)
Aegean Strike: Land, Air and Sea Combat in the Eastern Mediterranean (Victory Games, 1986)
Air & Armor: The Game of Battlefield Command in the Next War (West End Games, 1986)
Air Cav: Helicopter Warfare in the Eighties (West End Games, 1985)
Air Cobra: 1975–1988 Modern Tactical Airmobile Warfare (Operational Studies Group, 1980)
AirLand Battle: Corps Operational Command in Europe (Omega Games, 1988)
Assault: Tactical Combat in Europe: 1985 (Game Designers' Workshop, 1983)
BAOR: The Thin Red Line in the 1980s – Central Front Series, Volume 3 (SPI – S&T #88, 1981)
Battlefield: Europe (Game Designers' Workshop, 1990)
Berlin '85: The Enemy at the Gates (SPI – S&T #79, 1980)
Boots & Saddles: Air Cavalry in the '80s (Game Designers' Workshop, 1984)
Bundeswehr: An Assault Series Module (Game Designers' Workshop, 1986)
Bundeswehr: Northern Germany, late 1970s (SPI, 1977)
Central Command: Superpower Confrontation in the Straits of Hormuz (TSR – S&T #98, 1984)
The China War (SPI – S&T #76, 1979)
CityFight: Modern Combat in the Urban Environment (SPI, 1979)
Cold War Battles: Budapest '56 & Angola '87 (Decision Games – S&T #235, 2006)
Cold War Battles 2: Kabul '79 & Pentomic Wurzburg (Decision Games – S&T #263, 2010)
Corps Command: Dawn's Early Light (Lock 'N' Load Publishing, LLC, 2010)
Cuban Missile Crisis: The Threshold of Nuclear War (Microgame Design Group, 2002)
Dark Passage: The Invasion of Pakistan (Swedish Game Production, 1981)
Donau Front: Ardennes of the 1990s – Central Front Series, Volume 5 (3W – S&T #131, 1989)
Drive on Frankfurt (Pacific Rim Publishing – CounterAttack #4, 1981)
East and West (International Team, 1987)
The East is Red: The Sino-Soviet War (SPI – S&T #42, 1974)
FEBA (Forward Edge of the Battle Area) (Close Simulations, 1983)
Fifth Corps – Central Front Series, Volume 1 (SPI – S&T #82, 1980)
Firefight (SPI, 1976; TSR, Inc., 1983)
Firepower (Avalon Hill, 1984)
Fire Team: Modern Squad Level Command (West End Games, 1987)
First Strike (Schutze Games, 2008)
Fulda Gap (SPI, 1977)
Group of Soviet Forces, Germany (Decision Games – S&T #223, 2003)
Gulf Strike: Land, Air and Sea Combat in the Persian Gulf (Victory Games, 1983)
Harpoon: Modern Naval Wargame Rules (Game Designers' Workshop, 1981)
High Tide: The Cold War, 1980–1989 (Clash of Arms Games, 2003)
Hof Gap: The Nurnberg Pincer – Central Front Series, Volume 2 (SPI, 1980)
The Hunt for Red October (TSR, Inc., 1988)
Light Division: Flashpoint in the Gulf! (3W, 1989)
MBT (Avalon Hill, 1989)
Main Battle Area (Omega Games, 1985)
Mechwar '77 (SPI, 1975)
Mechwar 2 (SPI, 1979)
Mission: Grenada – Operation Urgent Fury (Close Simulations, 1985)
Mukden: Sino-Soviet Combat in the 70's (SPI, 1975)
NATO Division Commander (SPI, 1979)
NATO: Operational Combat in Europe in the 1970s (SPI, 1973)
NATO: The Next War in Europe (Victory Games, 1984)
The Next War: Modern Conflict in Europe (SPI, 1978)
NORAD: Strategic Game of Air Warfare (Simulations Design Corporation – Conflict #4, 1973)
Nordkapp: World War III in the Arctic Circle (TSR – S&T #94, 1983)
North German Plain: Ardennes of the 1990s – Central Front Series, Volume 4 (3W – S&T #117, 1988)
Objective Moscow (SPI, 1978)
Oil War: American Intervention in the Persian Gulf (SPI – S&T #52, 1975)
Operation Whirlwind: The Soviet Invasion of Hungary 1956 (Microgame Design Group, 2002)
RDF (Rapid Deployment Force): Global Cavalry for the 80's (TSR – S&T #91, 1983)
Red Christmas (Thunderhaven Game Company, 1992)
Red Star/White Star: Tactical Combat in Western Europe in the 1970s (SPI, 1972)
The Red Storm: NATO versus the Warsaw Pact (Yaquinto Games, 1983)
Red Storm Rising (TSR, Inc., 1989)
Revolt in the East: Warsaw Pact Rebellion in the 1970s (SPI – S&T #56, 1976)
Seapower & the State: A Strategic Study of World War Three at Sea, 1984–1994 (Simulations Canada, 1982)
Superpowers at War: Operations in Western Europe (TSR – S&T #100, 1985)
Tac Air: The Game of Modern Air-Land Battles in Germany (Avalon Hill, 1987)
Task Force: Naval Tactics and Operations in the 1980s (SPI, 1981)
Team Yankee (Game Designers' Workshop, 1987)
The Third World War: Arctic Front (Game Designers' Workshop, 1985)
The Third World War: Battle for Germany (Game Designers' Workshop, 1984)
The Third World War: Persian Gulf (Game Designers' Workshop, 1986)
The Third World War: Southern Front (Game Designers' Workshop, 1984)
Twilight Struggle: The Cold War, 1945–1989 (GMT Games, 2005)
Ultimatum: A Game of Nuclear Confrontation (Yaquinto Games, 1979)
Warplan Dropshot (Schutze Games, 2002)
World at War: Blood and Bridges (Lock 'N' Load Publishing, LLC, 2008)
World at War: Death of 1st Panzer (Lock 'N' Load Publishing, LLC, 2008)
World at War: Eisenbach Gap (Lock 'N' Load Publishing, LLC, 2007)
World War 3 (SPI, 1975)
Wurzburg: Soviet-American Combat in the 70's (SPI, 1975)
Yugoslavia: The Battles for Zagreb, 1979 (SPI, 1977)

Fictional

Alternate history 
Crimson Skies (FASA, 1998)
Dixie (Simulations Publications, Inc. – S&T #54, 1976)
Fortress America (Milton Bradley, 1986)
Amerika (Historical Board Gaming) 2015

Science fiction 
Alpha Omega (Battleline Publications, 1977; Avalon Hill, 1980)
Amoeba Wars (Avalon Hill, 1981)
Asteroid Zero-Four (Task Force Games, 1979)
The Awful Green Things from Outer Space (TSR, Inc. – Dragon Magazine #28 1979; Steve Jackson Games, 1990)
Azhanti High Lightning (Game Designers' Workshop, 1980)
BattleFleet Mars (Simulations Publications, Inc., 1977)
BattleTech (FASA, 1984)
Battlerider (Game Designers' Workshop)
Buck Rogers – Battle for the 25th Century (TSR, Inc., 1988)
Car Wars (Steve Jackson Games, 1981)
The Company War (Mayfair Games, 1983)
Cosmic Encounter (Eon Games, 1977; West End Games, 1986, Mayfair Games, 1991; Avalon Hill, 2000)
The Creature That Ate Sheboygan (Simulations Publications, Inc., 1979)
Dark Nebula: Battles for the Stars (Game Designers' Workshop, 1980)
Federation and Empire (Task Force Games, 1986; Amarillo Design Bureau, 2000)
Federation Commander: Klingon Border (Amarillo Design Bureau, 2005)
Federation Commander: Romulan Border (Amarillo Design Bureau, 2006)
Fifth Frontier War (Game Designers' Workshop, 1981)
Freedom in the Galaxy (Simulations Publications, Inc., 1979; Avalon Hill, 1981)
Gammarauders (TSR, Inc., 1987)
G.E.V. (Metagaming Concepts, 1978; Steve Jackson Games, 1980?)
Godsfire (Metagaming Concepts, 1979)
High Frontier (Sierra Madre Games), 2010)
Imperium (Game Designers' Workshop, 1977) – Imperium, 3rd Millennium (Avalanche Press, 2001)
Invasion America (Simulations Publications, Inc., 1976)
Invasion: Earth (Game Designers' Workshop, 1981)
Kill Ball (Travesty Games, 2010)
Mayday (Game Designers' Workshop, 1978)
Ogre (Metagaming Concepts, 1977; Steve Jackson Games, 1980?)
Renegade Legion: Centurion (FASA, 1988)
Renegade Legion: Interceptor (FASA, 1987)
Renegade Legion: Leviathan (FASA, 1989)
Renegade Legion: Prefect (FASA, 1992)
Rift Trooper (Attack Wargaming Association, 1976)
Risk 2210 A.D. (Avalon Hill, 2001)
Sky Galleons of Mars (Game Designers' Workshop, 1988)
Star Cruiser (Game Designers' Workshop)
Star Fleet Battles (Task Force Games, 1979; Amarillo Design Bureau, 1999)
Star Wars – The Queen's Gambit (Avalon Hill, 2000)
Star Wars Tactics (VASSAL Engine, 2009)
Starfire (Task Force Games, 1979) – Galactic Starfire (Starfire Design Studio, 2000)
Starfleet Wars (Superior Models, Inc., 1978)
StarForce: Alpha Centauri (Simulations Publications, Inc., 1974)
Starship: The Game of Space Contact (Fantasy Games Unlimited, 1975)
Starship & Empire (R-Squared Games, 1976)
Starship Troopers (Avalon Hill, 1976)
StarSoldier (Simulations Publications, Inc., 1977)
Stellar Conquest (Metagaming, 1975; Avalon Hill, 1984)
Triplanetary (Game Designers' Workshop, 1973)
Traveller Book 2 Starships (Game Designers' Workshop)
Traveller Book 5 High Guard (Game Designers' Workshop)
Twilight Imperium (Fantasy Flight Games, 2005)
The War of the Worlds II (Rand Game Associates, 1974)
WarpWar (Metagaming Concepts, 1977)
World War IV: One World, One King (Ziggurat Games, 2009)

Fantasy 
Albion: Land of Faerie (SPI – Ares #11, 1981)
Arena of Death (SPI – Ares #4, 1980)
Barbarian Kings (SPI – Ares #3, 1980)
Battle Masters (Milton Bradley, 1992)
The Battle of Helm's Deep (Fact & Fantasy Games, 1974)
BattleLore (Days of Wonder, 2006)
Dark Emperor (Avalon Hill, 1985)
Divine Right (TSR, Inc., 1979; Right Stuf International, 2002)
DragonRage (Dwarfstar Games, 1982; Flatlined Games, 2011)
A Game of Thrones (Fantasy Flight Games, 2003)
Gondor: The Siege of Minas Tirith (Simulations Publications, Inc., 1977)
Greyhawk Wars (TSR, Inc., 1991)
Kings & Things (West End Games, 1986)
Lankhmar (TSR, Inc., 1976)
Risk Godstorm (Avalon Hill, 2004)
Sauron (Simulations Publications, Inc., 1977)
The Siege of Minas Tirith (Fact and Fantasy Games, 1975)
Sorcerer (Simulations Publications, Inc., 1975)
Titan (Gorgonstar, 1980; Avalon Hill, 1982)
Warangel (Self published, 2001)
War of the Ring (Simulations Publications, Inc., 1977)
White Bear and Red Moon (Chaosium, 1975) – Dragon Pass (Chaosium, 1980; Avalon Hill, 1984)
Wizard's Quest (Avalon Hill, 1979)

Abstract/generic 
Attack! (Eagle Games, 2003)
Blitzkrieg (Avalon Hill, 1965)
Castle Risk (Parker Brothers, 1986)
Conquest (self published, 1972; Bütehorn, 1975 ; Hexagames, 1983 )
Farlander (Revaler, 2002)
Feudal (3M, 1967; Avalon Hill, 1976)
Insurgency (Battleline Publications, 1979)
Kriegspiel (Avalon Hill, 1970)
Pizza Wars (Heathen Thorn Enterprises, 1988)
Risk (Parker Brothers, 1959)
Strategy I (Simulations Publications, Inc., 1971)
Strike Force One (Simulations Publications, Inc., 1975)
Summit (Milton Bradley, 1961)
Supremacy (Supremacy Games, 1984)
Tactics (self published, 1953) – Tactics I (Avalon Hill, 1983)
Tactics II (Avalon Hill, 1958)
TEG: Plan Táctico y Estratégico de la Guerra (New Yetem, 1976 )
Warlord (Gibsons Games, 1978) – Apocalypse (Games Workshop, 1980)

See also 
List of miniature wargames

References

External links 
 Board Game Geek
 Web-Grognards
 iSimulacrum.com Wargame Database

 
Board wargames